HMS Peterel was one of two s to serve with the Royal Navy.  She was built by Palmers, was 215 feet long and the 6,200 H.P. produced by her Reed boilers gave her a top speed of 30 knots.  She was armed, as was standard, with a twelve pounder and two torpedo tubes.  She served in home waters throughout the Great War and was sold off in 1919.

Design and construction
Peterel was laid down (as Yard number 745) on 29 July 1898 by the Jarrow shipbuilder Palmers Shipbuilding and Iron Company Limited. Construction began 'on spec' (i.e. as a private venture by the builder without a specific order), but the part-built ship was included in a January 1899 tender by Palmers to supply three destroyers to the Royal Navy under a supplement to the 1899–1900 shipbuilding programme. The ship was launched on 30 March 1899 and Palmers' tender accepted in April 1899, the contract price being £47149 per ship.

Peterel closely resembled , built by Palmers under the previous year's shipbuilding programme, and like Spiteful had four funnels. Displacement was  light and  full load.

Armament was a single QF 12 pounder 12 cwt gun on a platform on the ship's conning tower (in practice the platform was also used as the ship's bridge), backed up by five 6-pounder guns, and two 18 inch (450 mm) torpedo tubes.

Service history
Peterel was delivered at Portsmouth in February 1900 for completion and armament and was completed in July that year. She took part in the 1901 Naval Manoeuvres. In 1910 Peterel was a member of the 4th Destroyer Flotilla based at Portsmouth, remaining part of the flotilla in 1912. On 30 August 1912 the Admiralty directed all destroyers were to be grouped into classes designated by letters based on contract speed and appearance. As a four-funneled 30-knotter destroyer, Peterel was assigned to the B Class.

In 1912, older destroyers were organised into Patrol Flotillas, with Peterel being part of the 6th Flotilla, based at Portsmouth, in March 1913.

Notes

Citations

Bibliography

 

B-class destroyers (1913)
Ships built on the River Tyne
1899 ships
World War I destroyers of the United Kingdom
Spiteful-class destroyers